West Devon is a local government district and borough in Devon, England.  Towns and villages in the district include Chagford, Okehampton, Princetown and Tavistock, where the council is based.

The district was formed on 1 April 1974, under the Local Government Act 1972, as a merger of the previous municipal borough of Okehampton, Okehampton Rural District, and Tavistock Rural District. West Devon contains most of Dartmoor.

Politics

Elections to the borough council are held every four years with 31 councillors representing 22 wards.

In 2013, the Local Government Boundary Commission for England initiated a review of West Devon with the aim of delivering electoral equality amongst voters at local elections, with each councillor representing a similar number of voters and with ward boundaries reflecting the interests and identities of local communities. After a consultation period, the commission recommended that West Devon should continue to be represented by 31 councillors and that certain changes should be made to the wards; they proposed moving from a two-member Dartmoor ward to two single-member wards called Dartmoor and Mary Tavy; and from a two-member Tamarside ward to two single-member wards, Tamarside and Milton Ford.

In the EU referendum of 2016, the majority of voters in West Devon voted to leave the European Union (18,937 to 16,658, that is 53.2% to 46.8%). The turnout was 81.25%.

In 2020, Cllr Mike Davies left the Conservatives to sit as an independent over the Conservative Government's handling of the Dominic Cummings breaking of lockdown rules during the COVID-19 pandemic. Since then a separate independent, Cllr Robin Musgrave has joined the Liberal Democrats. The net result is to leave the number of independents unchanged, the number of Conservatives down one and Liberal Democrats up one, thus denying the Conservatives an overall majority. The Conservatives regained a majority on the council in November 2021 following a by-election in the Bere Ferrers ward.

Services
Services provided by West Devon Borough Council to the local community include the administration of council tax and local benefits, the provision of car parking services, the collection of refuse and the recycling of waste, planning and building control, housing services, the provision of sport and leisure facilities, environmental services, business-related services and contingency planning.

Town Twinning
West Devon is twinned with  Wesseling, Germany since 1983.

See also
Grade I listed buildings in West Devon
Grade II* listed buildings in West Devon
Exeter to Plymouth railway of the LSWR

References

External links 

 
Non-metropolitan districts of Devon
Boroughs in England